Leptolalax fuliginosus is a frog species in the family Megophryidae. It is endemic to Thailand where it is only known from its type locality, Pa Lao U in Prachuap Khiri Khan Province.

References

fuliginosus
Endemic fauna of Thailand
Amphibians of Thailand
Amphibians described in 2006